Artists is a comedy-drama radio programme that aired from March 2003 until April 2004. There were two series broadcast on BBC Radio 4. It starred Vicki Pepperdine and Pauline McLynn.

Cast
 Vicki Pepperdine as Tamsin
 Pauline McLynn as Dolores
 Graham Crowden as Gerard
 Mina Anwar as Nisha
 Ben Miller as Josef
 Dave Lamb as Marcus

Plot
Set in St. Ives, Cornwall, a community of artists argue with each other and about their works.

Episodes

Series one

Series two

Broadcast History
The show was originally broadcast on BBC Radio 4, however repeats have also been aired on BBC Radio 7 and BBC Radio 4 Extra.

References

BBC Radio comedy programmes
2003 radio programme debuts
BBC Radio 4 programmes